Carlo Piacenza (December 3, 1814 in Turin – 1887) was an Italian painter, mainly of Genre landscape scenes of the Piedmont.

At the age of 20 years abandons his father's business, and becomes a pupil at the Accademia Albertina under Giovanni Battista Biscarra. He then apprentices with Pietro Fea. In 1840 he exits the academy. When Ernesto Allason became ill, he substituted for some time as tutor to the Savoyard princess in Turin. Among his works are:

References

1814 births
1887 deaths
Painters from Turin
19th-century Italian painters
Italian male painters
Accademia Albertina alumni
19th-century Italian male artists